Australia's Perfect Couple (formerly known as Here Come the Newlyweds and For Richer or Poorer during production) was an Australian reality television series which aired on the Nine Network. The series ran for six episodes,

Format
Australia's Perfect Couple featured eight newlywed couples brought together under the one roof. Knowledge of each other is put to the test in a competition where their devotion to their partner overshadows their need to win $210,000 in prize money. The winner was Gemma and Raf, beating foster parents Robbie and Dan.

Episodes

Notes

References

External links
 Official website

Nine Network original programming
2000s Australian reality television series
2009 Australian television series debuts
2009 Australian television series endings